Vertical transmission of symbionts is the transfer of a microbial symbiont from the parent directly to the offspring.  Many metazoan species carry symbiotic bacteria which play a mutualistic, commensal, or parasitic role.  A symbiont is acquired by a host via horizontal, vertical, or mixed transmission.

Implications 
Complex interdependence occurs between host and symbiont. The genetic pool of the symbiont is generally smaller and more subject to genetic drift. In true vertical transmission, the evolutionary outcomes of the host and symbiont are linked. If there is mixed transmission, new genetic material may be introduced. Generally, symbionts settle into specific niches and can even transfer part of their genome into the host nucleus.

Evolutionary consequences

Benefits 
The mechanism promotes tightly coupled evolutionary pressure, which causes the host and symbiont to function as a holobiont.

Disadvantages 
Evolutionary bottlenecks lead to less symbiont diversity, and thus resilience.  Similarly, this greatly reduces the effective population size. Ultimately, without an influx of new genetic material, the population becomes clonal.  Mutations tend to persist in symbionts and build up over time.

Transmission Modes

Matrilineal

Germline 
Since the egg contributes the organelles and has more space and opportunity for intracellular symbionts to be passed to subsequent generations, it is a very common method of vertical transmission.  Intracellular symbionts can migrate from the bacteriocyte to the ovaries and become incorporated in germ cells.

Live birth 
Human infants acquire their microbiome from their mothers, from every sphere where there is contact.  This includes potentially the mother's vagina, gastrointestinal tract, skin, mouth and breastmilk. These routes are typical if the delivery is a vaginal birth and the infant is nursed. When other actions, such as Caesarian delivery, bottle feeding, or maternal antibiotics during nursing occur, these modes of vertical transmission are disrupted.

Patrilineal 
Though extremely rare, Rickettsia is transmitted to Nephotettix cincticep through the paternal line in the sperm.

Aposymbiotic 
Earthworms (Eisenia) have an extracellular symbiont, Verminephrobacter. Rather than being passed through the egg in the germline, the young are aposymbiotic when still in the egg capsule; however, they acquire Verminephrobacter before the egg capsule ruptures, so it is still vertical transmission.

Well studied archetypes

Pea aphids and Buchnera 
Pea Aphids do not get all of the necessary amino acids from their diet.  Buchnera, synthesize the needed ones in an obligate relationship.

Head lice and Candidatus Riesia pediculicola 
The head louse (Pediculus humanus)  has an obligate symbiotic relationship with Candidatus Riesia pediculicola.  The louse provides shelter and protection while bacteria provides essential B vitamins. C. riesia lives in the bacteriocyte but move to the ovaries to be transmitted to the next generation.

References

Symbiosis